The Holy Spirit Hospital (Berlin) (Heilig-Geist-Spital in German) was one of the earliest hospitals in Berlin, established in 1250.  It was located on the western side of Spandauer Straße.

The hospital was a complex of buildings consisting of a house for the poor and sick, a home for the hospital staff, a small chapel, a preacher and sexton house, a hermitage and a large garden.  The Heilig-Geist-Kapelle, which belongs to the hospital, was built around 1300 and is one of the oldest surviving buildings in Berlin.  It remained intact during the Second World War , was thoroughly renovated in 1978/1979, and again in 2005.  It now serves as a ballroom for the Humboldt University on special occasions.

References

Defunct hospitals in Germany
Medical and health organisations based in Berlin
1250s establishments in Germany